Polynoncus ecuadorensis is a species of hide beetle in the subfamily Omorginae found in Ecuador.

References

ecuadorensis
Beetles described in 1962